Michael Shamberg (born 1945?) is an American film producer and former Time–Life correspondent.

Life and career
His credits include Erin Brockovich, A Fish Called Wanda, Garden State, Gattaca, Pulp Fiction and The Big Chill. His production companies include Jersey Films, with Stacey Sher and Danny DeVito, and, Double Feature Films, with Stacey Sher.

In the 1960s and 1970s, counter-culture video collectives extended the role of the underground press to new communication technologies. In 1970, Shamberg co-founded a video collective called Raindance Corporation, which published a newspaper-magazine called Radical Software. Raindance Corporation later became TVTV, or Top Value Television. Shamberg and his first wife Megan Williams were founding members of TVTV. The collective believed new technology could effect social change. An example was Shamberg's work on In Hiding: A Conversation with Abbie Hoffman, broadcast on Public-access television station WNET/13 in May 1975.

Shamberg described his approach as "guerrilla television" (the title of his 1971 book) because, despite its strategies and tactics similar to warfare, guerrilla television is non-violent and he saw it as a means to break through the barriers imposed by broadcast television, which he called beast television.

His TVTV group's documentary Lord of the Universe, 1974, won a DuPont-Columbia Award in 1975. The group urged for the use of Sony's Portapak video camera, introduced in 1967, to be merged with the documentary film style and television, and later pioneer use of 3/4" video in their works.

Shamberg is a graduate of Washington University in St. Louis, MO.

Filmography
He was a producer in all films unless otherwise noted.

Film

As an actor

Thanks

Television

As an editor

As writer

References

External links

1945 births
American film producers
Living people
Businesspeople from Chicago
Washington University in St. Louis alumni